An exoglycosidase is a glycoside hydrolase enzyme which breaks the glycosidic bonds at the  residue.
Exoglyxosidase breaks the molecule in the interior

See also
 Endoglycosidase

External links
 

Enzymes